Onthophagus dandalu is an Australian species of dung beetle in the genus Onthophagus.

References 

Scarabaeinae
Beetles described in 1972
Beetles of Australia